Xhemal Kondi was an Albanian politician and mayor of Tirana from 1924 through 1925.

References

Year of birth missing
Year of death missing
Mayors of Tirana